The following is an episode list for the Comedy Central series The Sarah Silverman Program. The series began on February 1, 2007, and six episodes were produced for the first season. After only two episodes had aired, Comedy Central ordered a second season of 14 episodes intending half of those to air in the fall. Following the October 3, 2007, premiere of the second season, Silverman stated in an interview that six episodes would air in the fall with another 10 episodes the following year. The third season ran from on February 4, 2010 to April 15, 2010 and consisted of 10 episodes.

A total of 32 episodes of the series have been produced over three seasons.

This list is ordered by episodes' original air dates.



Series overview

Episodes

Season 1 (2007)

Season 2 (2007–08)

Season 3 (2010)

References

External links
 

Sarah Silverman Program